Kochanovka is a rural locality in Selektsionny Selsoviet Rural Settlement, Lgovsky District, Kursk Oblast, Russia. Population:

Geography 
The village is located on the Bulgakovsky Brook (a tributary of the Apoka in the basin of the Seym), 43 km from the Russia–Ukraine border, 71 km south-west of Kursk, 7 km south-west of the district center – the town Lgov, 2.5 km from the selsoviet center – Selektsionny.

 Climate
Kochanovka has a warm-summer humid continental climate (Dfb in the Köppen climate classification).

Transport 
Kochanovka is located 3 km from the road of regional importance  (Kursk – Lgov – Rylsk – border with Ukraine) as part of the European route E38, on the road of intermunicipal significance  (38K-017 – Arsenyevka – Kochanovka – the railway halt 387 km), next to the railway halt 387 km (railway line 322 km – Lgov I).

The rural locality is situated 78 km from Kursk Vostochny Airport, 144 km from Belgorod International Airport and 281 km from Voronezh Peter the Great Airport.

References

Notes

Sources

Rural localities in Lgovsky District